Bill I. Foster (born December 23, 1946) is an American politician who served in the Missouri Senate. He served in the National Guard.  Foster served as mayor of Poplar Bluff from 1979 until 1980.  He previously served in the Missouri House of Representatives between 1993 and 2001.

References

1946 births
Living people
Mayors of places in Missouri
People from Poplar Bluff, Missouri
Republican Party members of the Missouri House of Representatives
Republican Party Missouri state senators